The Masnàn is a mountain of the Swiss Lepontine Alps, located east of Biasca and Osogna in the canton of Ticino.

References

External links
 Masnàn on Hikr

Mountains of the Alps
Mountains of Switzerland
Mountains of Ticino
Lepontine Alps